Tomislav Lopatić (born 6 March 1963) is a Bosnia and Herzegovina biathlete. He competed at the 1984 Winter Olympics and the 1992 Winter Olympics.

References

External links
 

1963 births
Living people
Bosnia and Herzegovina male biathletes
Olympic biathletes of Yugoslavia
Biathletes at the 1984 Winter Olympics
Biathletes at the 1992 Winter Olympics
People from Pale, Bosnia and Herzegovina
Serbs of Bosnia and Herzegovina